Hassan Ali Kasi (born 1999) is a Qari and Hafiz e Quran from Quetta, Pakistan. In 2021, Kasi won first place in a Quran recitation competition Siraj Al-Kabeer, held in Afghanistan.

Kasi was eight years old when he began to earn recognition for his memorization and Qira'at skills and memorized the Quran at early age. He learned Tajwid from his father and recitation styles from his uncle.

Kasi finished college in Quetta and later moved to Islamabad to continue Islamic studies at International Islamic University Islamabad.

Awards and recognition 
 3rd position in Turkey International Holy Quran Competition 2013
 1st position in Swat National Qiraat Competition 2013
 Dunya News 10 winners of Hayya Al As-Salawat Competition 2014
 1st position in Bol TV Quran Competition 2017
 4th position in Al-Kawthar 13th International Quran Competition 2020
 1st position in International Holy Quran Recitation Competition Afghanistan 2021
 National Youth Award by the Minhaj Youth League as a High Achiever in the Field of Qira’at for representing Pakistan in the International Quran Recitation Competition 2021 held in Afghanistan.
 In 2021, he was awarded a shield and certificate by the president of the International Islamic University, as a high achievers of the year.

References

External links
 
   (official Facebook page)

Pakistani Quran reciters
International Islamic University, Islamabad alumni
Living people
1999 births